is an air traffic control center located in the Namiki area of Tokorozawa, Saitama Prefecture, Japan in the Greater Tokyo Area. The center is north of the special wards of Tokyo.

As of 2001 the center controlled airspace in the Kantō, Jōetsu, Tōhoku, Chūbu, and Hokuriku regions and a portion of the Kansai region.

Incidents
On Wednesday, January 31, 2001, two Japan Airlines aircraft narrowly avoided a mid-air collision. The two airliners conflicted. Japan Airlines Flight 958, using a Douglas DC-10, descended according to traffic collision avoidance system (TCAS) instructions. A center employee told Japan Airlines Flight 907, using a Boeing 747-400, to descend while its TCAS told the pilots to climb.

References

External links
 Tokyo Area Control Center

Air traffic control centers
Buildings and structures in Tokorozawa, Saitama
Air traffic control in Asia
Aviation in Japan